Hypomyces lateritius is a parasitic ascomycete fungus that grows on certain species of  Lactarius mushrooms, improving their flavor and densifying the flesh. Hosts include L. camphoratus, L. chelidonium, L. controversus, L. deliciosus, Lactarius indigo, L. rufus, L. salmonicolor, L. sanguifluus, L. semisanguifluus, L. tabidus, L. trivialis, and L. vinosus.

It is a microscopic fungus causing the formation of a macroscopic whitish subiculum over the hymenium of its host species, preventing gill formation. Presence of H. lateritius also often deforms the cap and stipe. Parasitization by H. lateritius does not prevent latex from forming when the flesh is cut.

Distribution 
Hypomyces lateritius can be found wherever lactarius species can be found, in North America from Alaska to Mexico and in Europe from the Iberian peninsula to the Ukraine. In Asia in Kazakhstan, Kyrgyzstan and Western Siberia. It has also been reported in New Zealand and South Africa.

Synonyms 
Sphaeria lateritia Fries, Syst. Mycol. 2: 338. 1823.

Hypocrea lateritia (Fr.) Fries, Summa Veg. Scand. 383.1849.

Peckiella lateritia (Fr.) Maire, Ann. Mycol. 4: 331.1906.

Byssonectria lateritia (Fr.) Petch, J. Bot. Lond. 75: 220.1937.

Hypomyces volemi Peck, Bull. Torrey Club 27: 20. 1900.

Peckiella hymenioides Peck, Bull. Torrey Club 34: 102.1907.

Hypomyces camphorati Peck, New York State Bull. 205:23. 1905 (1906).

Peckiella camphorati (Peck) Seaver, Mycologia 2: 68.1910.

Hypomyces camphorati (syn. Peckiella camphorati) is sometimes treated as a separate species from H. lateritius. Subiculum of specimens with L. camphoratus host tends more yellowish, and displays slightly larger ascospores. More research is required to determine whether H. lateritius is a single species or a species complex.

References

External links 

Hypocreaceae
Edible fungi
Parasitic fungi